Erythroplusia is a genus of moths of the family Noctuidae.

Species
 Erythroplusia pyropia Butler, 1879
 Erythroplusia rutilifrons Walker, 1858

References
 Erythroplusia at Markku Savela's Lepidoptera and Some Other Life Forms
 Natural History Museum Lepidoptera genus database

Plusiinae